Doomed to Die is a 1940 American mystery film directed by William Nigh and starring Boris Karloff as Mr. Wong with Marjorie Reynolds and Grant Withers. It is a sequel to the 1940 film, The Fatal Hour, which also featured Withers and Reynolds.

Plot

When the head of a shipping company is murdered in his office the identity of the killer seems obvious. The killer is the son of the owner of a rival shipping company; the reason is the Romeo and Juliet romance between the killer and the murdered man's daughter. They wanted to get married. The murdered man refused to give them his permission.

The murdered man's daughter asks Mr. Wong to investigate. She hopes that Wong will be able to prove that her fiancé didn't kill her father.

The killing took place a few days after the Wentworth Castle, one of the company's liners, caught fire and sank with the loss of more than 400 lives. Once again, Wong is given important information by the leader of a powerful tong (Chinese secret society) that leads him to other suspects. The tong leader tells Wong that a member of the tong was smuggling a great amount of tong money into the United States aboard the Wentworth Castle. The smuggler is known to have survived the sinking but disappeared with the tong's money.

Wong uses modern (for 1940) technology to recover seemingly "lost" evidence. He uncovers multiple conspiracies within the shipping company and succeeds in proving that the fiancé is not the murderer.

Cast

 Boris Karloff as James Lee Wong
 Marjorie Reynolds as Roberta "Bobbie" Logan
 Grant Withers as Capt. William "Bill" Street
 William Stelling as Dick Fleming
 Catherine Craig as Cynthia Wentworth
 Guy Usher – Paul Fleming 
 Henry Brandon as Victor "Vic" Martin
 Melvin Lang as Cyrus P. Wentworth
 Wilbur Mack as Matthews 
 Kenneth Harlan as Ludlow 
 Richard Loo as Tong leader

Production
Filming began in mid June. The film uses actual news footage from the burning of the liner , which caught fire on September 8, 1934 during a trip from Havana to New York City.

References

External links

 
 
 
 
 
 Doomed to Die at Google Videos

1940 films
American black-and-white films
American detective films
Monogram Pictures films
Films directed by William Nigh
American sequel films
American mystery films
Films set in San Francisco
1940 mystery films
Tongs (organizations)
1940s English-language films
1940s American films